The 1952 NCAA Men's Ice Hockey Tournament was the culmination of the 1951–52 NCAA men's ice hockey season, the 5th such tournament in NCAA history. It was held between March 13 and 15, 1952, and concluded with Michigan defeating Colorado College 4-1. All games were played at the Broadmoor Ice Palace in Colorado Springs, Colorado.

This was the first tournament to include teams that played in a conference. The MCHL had been created before the start of the season and through both of the conference representatives had appeared in the tournament previously both were independent. The Tri-State League also sent its first representative to the tournament after the conference began play the year before.

Qualifying teams
Four teams qualified for the tournament, two each from the eastern and western regions. The two best MCHL teams and a Tri-State League representative received bids into the tournament as did one independent school.

Format
The eastern team judged as better was seeded as the top eastern team while the MCHL champion was given the top western seed. The second eastern seed was slotted to play the top western seed and vice versa. All games were played at the Broadmoor Ice Palace. All matches were Single-game eliminations with the semifinal winners advancing to the national championship game and the losers playing in a consolation game.

Bracket

Note: * denotes overtime period(s)

Results

Semifinals

St. Lawrence vs. Michigan

Colorado College vs. Yale

Consolation Game

St. Lawrence vs. Yale

National Championship

Colorado College vs. Michigan

All-Tournament team

First Team
G: Ken Kinsley* (Colorado College)
D: Jim Haas (Michigan)
D: Len Maccini (Colorado College)
F: George Chin (Michigan)
F: John McKennell (Michigan)
F: Doug Philpott (Michigan)
* Most Outstanding Player(s)

Second Team
G: Paul Cruikshank (Yale)
D: Steve Leolich (Colorado College)
D: Reg Shave (Michigan)
F: Earl Keyes (Michigan)
F: Wally Kilrea Jr. (Yale)
F: Omer Brandt (Colorado College)

References

Tournament
NCAA Division I men's ice hockey tournament
NCAA Men's Ice Hockey Tournament
NCAA Men's Ice Hockey Tournament
1950s in Colorado Springs, Colorado
Ice hockey competitions in Colorado Springs, Colorado